Transit First was an Australian bus company operating in the south-western suburbs of Sydney.

History
Transit First's origins can be traced back to August 1982 when Peter Threlkeld purchased Holswothy Bus Co with 15 buses and services between Liverpool, Holswothy and East Hills adopting the trading name of Westway Bus & Coach Service. In July 1987 Milperra Bus Co was purchased with services between Milperra and Bankstown.

In January 1997 Westway purchased the routes 915 to 921 in the Auburn and Bankstown area from Crossley Bus Lines. In May 2003 Bankstown-Strathfield Bus Service and West Bankstown Bus Service were purchased from the Treuer family. In July 2003 the combined operation was rebranded as Transit First.

Due to the Sydney Metropolitan Bus Service Contracts that started in January 2005, some of the Baxter's Bus Lines were transferred to Connex and Transit First. In September 2006, the services that were transferred to Connex were eventually replaced by new services which were operated by Transit First.

In February 2007 Transit First was sold to Veolia Transport NSW.

Routes
Transit First operated 15 bus routes in south-western Sydney:
900: Liverpool - Burwood via Bankstown (Formerly Route 860: Liverpool to Bankstown via Milperra)
901: Liverpool - Holsworthy via Wattle Grove (Formerly Route 863)
902: Liverpool - Holsworthy via Moorebank (Formerly Route 862)
902X: Voyager Point, Pleasure Point, Sandy Point (Formerly Route 862's extension)
903: Liverpool - Chipping Norton - Liverpool (Formerly Route 861)
904: Liverpool - Fairfield via Lansvale
905: Fairfield - Bankstown via Villawood
909: Bankstown - Parramatta via Auburn
911: Bankstown - Auburn via Chester Hill
913: Bankstown - Strathfield via Roberts Road
914: Greenacre - Strathfield
915: Lidcombe - University via TAFE
925: Bankstown - Condell Park - East Hills

Shopper Hopper services
S1: Lansvale - Cabramatta Shops
S2: Auburn Botanic Gardens - Auburn Shops

Fleet
Westway operated a varied fleet of Albions, Hinos, Leylands, MANs and Volvos. In the late 1990s it standardised on Mercedes-Benz O405s. Westway adopted a white, red and blue livery. Transit First adopted a white, green and blue livery.

External links
Company website February 2007
Westway website April 2001

References

Bus companies of New South Wales
Bus transport in Sydney
Transport companies established in 1982
Transport companies disestablished in 2007
2007 disestablishments in Australia
Australian companies established in 1982
Defunct bus companies of Australia
Australian companies disestablished in 2007